Charles Pozzi (27 August 1909 – 28 February 2001) was a  French  racing driver  who participated in one World Championship Formula One race in 1950, the year of its inception.

Racing career
Born Carlo Alberto Pozzi in Paris, France of Italian parentage, he became known as Charles, the French translation of his name. He was working as an automobile broker and his career as a racing driver only began when he  was already 37 years old. Later in life, as the official French importer of Ferrari and Maserati automobiles, his name was to appear on many racing cars.

In 1946, he competed, with his Delahaye 135CS, in several races including the Grand Prix of Bourgogne – Dijon where he finished in fourth position and the Le Mans Grand Prix, raced on the Nantes race track this year, where he finished in fifth position, driving a Delahaye.

In 1949, he won the Comminges sports car Grand Prix, in Saint-Gaudens, with a Delahaye 145 (chassis N° 48775), equipped with a 4.5-litre six-cylinder Delahaye 175 engine.

Major achievements 

Note: 35th Grand Prix de L'ACF results shared with Louis Rosier as co-driver

 1947, raced at:
 Grand Prix of Pau,
 Grand Prix Automobile of Marseille,
 Circuit des Remparts in Angoulême,
 Grand Prix du Comminges in Saint-Gaudens.
 1948, raced at:
 Grand Prix des Nations in Genève,
 DNF at Grand Prix du Comminges in Saint-Gaudens (Talbot).
 1949, raced at Grand Prix Automobile of Pau,
 1952, won the 12 Hours of Casablanca, Morocco
 1953, won :
 the first position of the 12H of Hyères in the 2L category and at the third overall position,
 the second position of the 12H of Reims in the 2L category and the 6th position in the overall ranking. For these two events, he raced on the Ferrari 166MM Berlinetta Vignale which belong to his teammate François Picard.
 the third position at the 12 Hours of Agadir Morocco with a Lancia Aurelia
 1954, finished :
 the 12 hours of Hyères in 2nd position with a Ferrari 500 Mondial,
 the 12 hours of Reims in 9th position with the same car.
 the hillclimb de Planfoy.

Pozzi's business 
After his retirement from racing, he founded Charles Pozzi S.A., the official importer of Ferrari and Maserati motor vehicles in France. In 2003, the company was acquired by the Ferrari company.

Pozzi died in 2001 in Levallois-Perret, a suburb in western Paris.

Complete Formula One World Championship results
(key)

''* Indicates Shared Drive with Louis Rosier

References 

1909 births
2001 deaths
French racing drivers
Grand Prix drivers
French Formula One drivers
French people of Italian descent
Racing drivers from Paris
24 Hours of Le Mans drivers
World Sportscar Championship drivers